Ernest "Ernie, Mighty Mite" Slyziuk (March 12, 1920 - January 2, 2001) was an American curler. He played second on the Detroit Curling Club team (from Detroit, Michigan) during the Curling World Championships known as the 1963 Scotch Cup. Slyziuk and his team ended up taking third place and were awarded the bronze medal.

He joined the Detroit Curling Club in 1950 and served as its President in 1978-79 and 1979-80. An active curler for over 30 years, he was U.S. National Champion in 1958 and 1963, attending the Nationals ten times.

In 1996 he was inducted to United States Curling Hall of Fame.

He started curling at the age of 12 with his older brother Mike Slyziuk in Grandview, Manitoba, Canada where they were born.

References

External links
 
 
 

1920 births
2001 deaths
American male curlers
American curling champions
Canadian people of Ukrainian descent
American people of Ukrainian descent
Canadian emigrants to the United States
People from Parkland Region, Manitoba